Interior design education is the teaching of skills and information needed to perform interior design work. Education in this field is offered in different parts of the world; however, the application requirements for acceptance vary among countries and schools. There are a number of different routes to attain qualifications in interior design. An interior design education will teach people how to draw and to plan out a space, and will cover the latest design software along with other important coursework that will prepare them for this field of work. Education includes consideration for the design brief, design processes from concept to scheme development and implementation, as well as exploring surrounding philosophies, trends, sector specialisms and professional skills required for practice.

This field offers multiple job opportunities such as owning a business and teaching along with chances of promotions within established firms. Some schools will offer education in interior architecture together with interior design; these are not the same field of study but do overlap in some ways.

Asia 
Interior designing in Asia has been an old art. Several private institutions and universities offer interior design courses in Asia that are at par with the courses offered in the developed parts of the world. Associate, bachelor's and master's degrees in interior design are offered by institutes including Raffles,  Indian Institute of Architecture and Design, Hong Kong Polytechnic University, and CID.

Israel 
In Israel there are colleges offering four baccalaureate degrees in Interior Design. Some design colleges also offer an Interior Design program as a stand-alone program.

Africa 
Interior design education has been delivered in South Africa since the 1870s, and this education is on par with programs offered in most developed countries of the world. In Africa, interior design programs are offered at universities, institutes of technology and at registered private colleges.

Europe
In Europe, the educational requirements differ between interior architects (considered a profession comparable to architects or structural engineers) and interior designers (considered a trade comparable to carpenters).

Traditionally in Germany, Interior Architecture has been taught at polytechnic universities or universities of applied sciences. Baccalaureate programs are normally three years (6 semesters) in length. In Germany, the adaptation of the university system to the international degrees Bachelor and Master has led to a restructuring of degree programs. Since university education traditionally lasted at least 5 years, many Diploma programs have been transformed into consecutive graduate Master programs. Some European universities form partnerships with other universities to offer "internationally orientated Masters courses" in Interior Design, where parts of the course takes place between European partner institutions to offer comprehensive instruction in the Interior Design program, including preparation for the Interior Design qualification exam.

In the UK around fifty universities and art colleges offer 3-year degree courses and, in some cases, year-long Master of Arts courses in interior design. London's Royal College of Art is the world's leading centre for post-graduate studies in art and design subjects and offers a two-year MA programme in interior design that is recognised as the foremost course in the subject. Manchester Metropolitan University runs a BA (Hons.) course in interior design.

North America

Canada
Canadian interior design education can be acquired through the college or university level.  Unlike the programs offered in the United States, a degree is not required to become a registered professional designer.  Admission to programs marks and creative ability as demonstrated in a portfolio submission. Once accepted into a program, seven years of combined educational and work experience is required before one can take the professional examination to become a registered interior designer. Therefore, if someone graduates from a three-year college diploma program, they will need a minimum of four years working experience, whereas someone graduating from a four-year degree program only needs three. Master's degree programs in Interior Design are far less common in Canada, with the most established being at the University of Manitoba.

United States

Interior Design degree offerings
In the United States many universities and colleges offer four year baccalaureate degrees in Interior Design. Some design colleges also offer Interior Design program as stand-alone program. Master's degrees (MS, MA, MFA and recently the MID) in Interior Design are also available, although this advanced degree is less common than the baccalaureate degree. Many professionals pursue advanced degrees in related subjects, such as industrial design, fine art or education. PhD programs in interior design are increasing in number at various institutions of higher education but only in certain states

Distance education in Interior Design
Educational institutions have expanded beyond the traditional, studio-based instruction in interior design by offering online degree programs for distance learners of interior design. The online degree programs, like the ones offered in traditional form, feature a comprehensive curriculum under offerings that range from 60-credit diploma courses to certificate programs, and to as many as 132 credits for a full-blown baccalaureate degree program.

Recognition of degree programs
Some graduate degree programs in interior design do not require a bachelor's degree in a related field. Although most interior design schools in the United States retain "Interior Design" in the program name, some schools have adopted the name "Interior Architecture" instead. However, programs with "Interior Architecture" in its name may not be comparable to programs for interior design.  Sometimes the distinction is drawn between programs which teach courses in structures and programs which do not.  It is important to note, that a practicing professional cannot use the title of "Interior Architect," unless the person also completes the requirements for becoming a licensed architect.

Training, other qualifications, and advancement for US interior designers
Post secondary education—especially a bachelor's degree—is recommended, but not required, for entry-level positions in interior design. 3 States plus the District of Columbia, and Puerto Rico license interior designers and 19 states certify or register interior designers. Following formal training, graduates may enter a 1-year to 3-year apprenticeship to gain experience before taking a national licensing exam or joining a professional association. Designers in States that do not require the exam may opt to take it as proof of their qualifications. The National Council for Interior Design Qualification (NCIDQ) administers the licensing exam. To be eligible to take the exam, applicants must have at least 6 years of combined education and experience in interior design, of which at least 2 years constitute post secondary education in design. Once candidates have passed the qualifying exam, they are granted the title of Certified, Registered, or Licensed Interior Designer, depending on the state. Some states require continuing education units in order to maintain one's license.

Training programs are available from professional design schools or from colleges and universities and usually take 2 to 4 years to complete. Graduates of 2-year and 3-year programs are awarded certificates or associate degrees in interior design and normally qualify as assistants to interior designers upon graduation. Graduates with bachelor's degrees usually qualify for entry into a formal design apprenticeship program. Basic coursework includes computer-aided design (CAD) and building information modeling (BIM),  building and life safety codes, ADA regulations, building systems, space planning, drawing and sketching, perspective, color psychology, materiality, interior and architectural history, ergonomics, anthroprometrics, ethics, business principles and human psychology.

The National Association of Schools of Art and Design accredits approximately 250 post secondary institutions with programs in art and design. Most of these schools award a degree in interior design. Applicants may be required to submit sketches and other examples of their artistic ability.

The Council for Interior Design Accreditation is the preeminent accreditor of interior design programs that lead to a bachelor's degree. In 2016, there were 182 accredited programs in interior design worldwide, located primarily in schools of art, architecture, and design.

After the completion of formal training, interior designers will enter a 2-year to 3-year apprenticeship to gain experience before taking a licensing exam. Most apprentices work in design or architecture firms under the strict supervision of an experienced designer. Apprentices also may choose to gain experience working as an in-store designer in furniture stores. The NCIDQ offers the Interior Design Experience Program (IDEP), which helps entry-level interior designers gain valuable work experience by supervising work experience and offering mentoring services and workshops to new designers.

Following the apprenticeship, designers may choose to take the national licensing exam. Recent graduate may also choose to become members of a professional association. Because registration or license is not mandatory in all states, membership in a professional association is an indication of an interior designer's qualifications and professional standing.

Employers increasingly prefer interior designers who are familiar with CAD and BIM software. Interior designers also need to know the basics of architecture and engineering in order to ensure that their designs meet building safety codes and ADA requirements. Other skills obtained through an education in interior design include space planning, architectural lighting, textiles, rendering, ergonomics, etc.

In addition to possessing technical knowledge, interior designers must be creative, imaginative, and persistent and must be able to communicate their ideas in writing, visually, and verbally. Because technology and human experiences change rapidly, designers need to be well read, open to new ideas and influences, and quick to react to changing experiences. Problem-solving and critical thinking skills,  and the ability to work independently and under pressure are important traits. People in this field need self-discipline to start projects on their own, to budget their time, and to meet deadlines and production schedules. Good business sense and sales ability also are important, especially for those who freelance or run their own business.

Beginning interior designers receive on-the-job training and normally need 1 to 3 years of training before they can advance to higher level positions. Experienced designers in large firms may advance to project designer, project manager, or some other supervisory position. Some experienced designers open their own firms or decide to specialize in one aspect of interior design. Other designers leave the occupation to become teachers in schools of design or in colleges and universities. Many faculty members continue to consult privately or operate small design studios to complement their classroom activities.

See also
Interior Architecture
Interior Design

References

education
Architectural education